In mathematics, Weyl's theorem or Weyl's lemma might refer to one of a number of results of Hermann Weyl. These include

 the Peter–Weyl theorem
 Weyl's theorem on complete reducibility, results originally derived from the unitarian trick on representation theory of semisimple groups and semisimple Lie algebras
 Weyl's theorem on eigenvalues
 Weyl's criterion for equidistribution (Weyl's criterion)
 Weyl's lemma on the hypoellipticity of the Laplace equation
 results estimating Weyl sums in the theory of exponential sums
 Weyl's inequality
 Weyl's criterion for a number to be in the essential spectrum of an operator